NCTR may refer to:
NOAA Center for Tsunami Research
Non-Cooperative Target Recognition 
North Central Texas Railway, USA
National Council on Teacher Retirement, USA
National Center for Toxicological Research, USA
National Centre for Truth and Reconciliation, Canada
North Cyprus Turkish Republic